Indiana is a state in the United States of America.

Indiana may also refer to:

Places
Indiana Territory, a former territory in the United States from 1803 to 1813 encompassing the present-day state of Indiana and surrounding areas
Indiana County, Pennsylvania, United States
Indiana, Pennsylvania, a borough in Indiana County, Pennsylvania, United States, that is also its county seat
Indiana Township, Allegheny County, Pennsylvania, a township in Allegheny County, Pennsylvania, United States
Indiana, São Paulo, in Brazil
Indiana, Ontario, Canada
Indiana District, Maynas, Peru

Schools
Indiana University, a multi-campus public university system in Indiana, comprising the following:
Six campuses operated solely by this system:
Indiana University Bloomington
Indiana University East
Indiana University Kokomo
Indiana University Northwest
Indiana University South Bend
Indiana University Southeast
Three campuses operated in cooperation with another major public university, Purdue University:
Indiana University – Purdue University Columbus (administered by IU)
Indiana University – Purdue University Fort Wayne (administered by Purdue)
Indiana University – Purdue University Indianapolis (administered by IU)
Indiana Hoosiers, the athletic program of Indiana University Bloomington 
Indiana University Press, the publishing house of Indiana University
Indiana State University
Indiana State Sycamores, the athletic program of Indiana State University
Indiana University of Pennsylvania
Indiana Area School District

People
Indiana Evans (born 1990), an Australian Home and Away actress
Indiana (singer) (born 1987), English electronica singer-songwriter
Indiana Massara (born 2002), Australian actress, singer, and Internet personality
Indiana "Indy" Neidell (born 1967), American-Swedish actor and YouTube personality
Indiana Woodward, French ballet dancer
Robert Indiana (1928–2018), an American artist

Naval ships
, a class of three late 19th-century United States battleships
, individual battleships which have borne the name

Transport
List of ships named after Indiana
, merchant and passenger ships which have borne the name
Indiana station (CTA), a station on the Chicago Transit Authority's 'L' system
Indiana station (Los Angeles Metro), an at-grade light rail station in the Los Angeles County Metro Rail system

Music
Indiana (Jon McLaughlin album), 
Indiana (David Mead album), 2004
"Indiana" (song), a 2015 song by Sarsa
"Back Home Again in Indiana" or "(Back Home Again in) Indiana", written by James F. Hanley
"Indiana", a 2013 song by Tom Aspaul
"Indiana", a song by Spanish rock band Hombres G

Other
Indiana Jones (character), a fictional archaeologist
Indiana (genus), a genus of bradoriid
Indiana (statue), a public artwork by Retta T. Matthews
Indiana (novel), an 1831 novel by George Sand
Project Indiana, OpenSolaris project
1602 Indiana, an asteroid
 Indiana (horse)

See also